The 1976–77 Divizia C was the 21st season of Liga III, the third tier of the Romanian football league system.

Team changes

To Divizia C
Relegated from Divizia B
 CS Botoșani
 Minerul Motru
 Minerul Moldova Nouă
 Cimentul Medgidia
 Metalul Mija
 Gaz Metan Mediaș
 Viitorul Vaslui
 Metrom Brașov
 Victoria Carei
 Tulcea
 Autobuzul București
 Unirea Tomnatic

Promoted from County Championship
 ITA Piatra Neamț
 Metalul Botoșani
 Partizanul Bacău
 Nicolina Iași
 Dinamo Focșani
 Recolta Săhăteni
 Metalosport Galați
 Victoria Țăndărei
 Șantierul Naval Constanța
 Abatorul București
 Viitorul Chirnogi
 Progresul Pucioasa
 Dacia Pitești
 Petrolul Videle
 Laminorul IPA Slatina
 Laminorul Nădrag
 Nera Bozovici
 Victoria Zalău
 Oțelul Bihor
 Mureșul Luduș
 Lăpușul Târgu Lăpuș
 Mureșul Toplița
 Măgura Codlea
 FIL Orăștie
 Automecanica Mediaș

From Divizia C
Promoted to Divizia B
 Minerul Gura Humorului
 Relonul Săvinești
 Olimpia Râmnicu Sărat
 Portul Constanța
 Tehnometal București
 Flacăra-Automecanica Moreni
 Minerul Lupeni
 Aurul Brad
 Armătura Zalău
 Minerul Cavnic
 Chimica Târnăveni
 Oltul Sfântu Gheorghe

Relegated to County Championship
 Locomotiva Adjud
 Tractorul Văleni
 Petrolul Berca
 Carpați Nehoiu
 Granitul Babadag
 Voința Constanța
 IPRECA Călărași
 Rapid Fetești
 Electrica Titu
 Voința Caracal
 Victoria Craiova
 CFR Caransebeș
 Minerul Oravița
 Rapid Jibou
 Constructorul Satu Mare
 CM Cluj-Napoca
 Progresul Năsăud
 Vitrometan Mediaș
 Lacul Ursu Sovata
 Miercurea Ciuc
 Metalul Târgu Secuiesc

Renamed teams 
Metalurgistul Iași was renamed as Tepro Iași.

Chimia Brăila was renamed as Unirea Tricolor Brăila.

Viitorul Brăila was renamed as Dacia Unirea Brăila.

Gloria Murfatlar was renamed as Gloria Poarta Albă.

Triumf București was renamed as Automecanica București.

Vulturii Câmpulung was renamed as Muscelul Câmpulung.

FOB Balș was renamed as IOB Balș.

Cimentul Victoria Târgu Jiu was renamed as Pandurii Târgu Jiu.

Dinamo Orșova was renamed as Dierna Orșova.

Constructorul Timișoara was renamed as Banatul Timișoara.

Dinamo MIU Oradea was renamed as Înfrățirea Oradea.

UPA Sibiu was renamed as IPA Sibiu.

Minerul Teliuc was renamed as Laminorul Teliuc.

Other 
Meva Drobeta-Turnu Severin and Metalul Drobeta-Turnu Severin merged, the first one being absorbed by the second one. After the merge, Metalul Drobeta-Turnu Severin was renamed as CSM Drobeta-Turnu Severin.

Unirea Drobeta-Turnu Severin spared from relegation due to the merge of Meva Drobeta-Turnu Severin and Metalul Drobeta-Turnu Severin.

Constructorul Botoșani, Spicul Țigănași and Victoria Roman withdrew.

Foresta Moldovița and Metalurgistul Iași were spared from relegation.

League tables

Seria I

Seria II

Seria III

Seria IV

Seria V

Seria VI

Seria VII

Seria VIII

Seria IX

Seria X

Seria XI

Seria XII

See also 
 1976–77 Divizia A
 1976–77 Divizia B
 1976–77 County Championship

References 

Liga III seasons
3
Romania